Nishant Kantawala (born 15 October 1996) is an Indian cricketer. He made his first-class debut on 13 March 2020, for Galle Cricket Club in Tier B of the 2019–20 Premier League Tournament.

References

External links
 

1996 births
Living people
Indian cricketers
Galle Cricket Club cricketers
Place of birth missing (living people)